Evangeline Heartz was a state representative in Colorado. She represented Denver. She was first elected to the state house in 1896. She was a Populist Party candidate.

She opposed capital punishment and introduced a bill to ban hanging as a punishment in Colorado.

References

Politicians from Denver
19th-century American women politicians
Year of birth missing (living people)
Living people
Members of the Colorado House of Representatives
Colorado Populists
20th-century American politicians
20th-century American women politicians
19th-century American politicians